The River Fire was a wildfire that burned  in the Colfax area in Nevada County and Placer County, California, in the United States during the 2021 California wildfire season. The fire was first reported on Wednesday, August 4, 2021, and was fully contained on Friday, August 13, 2021. The River Fire destroyed 142 structures, damaged 21 more, and resulted in 4 injuries to firefighters and civilians. It was the 5th most destructive fire of 2021 in California. The exact cause of the fire is unknown, but CAL FIRE officials stated after an investigation that it had been "determined to be of human cause," originating in the overnight camping area of Bear River Campground west of Colfax.

Events 
Before the fire started, the National Weather Service issued a Red Flag Warning for much of northeastern California (including the region the River Fire burned within) between August 4 and August 5, due to forecast gusty winds and low humidity. In such conditions, large fires can start easily and spread rapidly with extreme fire behavior. 

On August 4, 2021, at approximately 1:59 PM, the River Fire started in the brush alongside the Bear River in the overnight camping area of Bear River Campground, in Placer County.  The fire quickly jumped the river into Nevada County, and expanded up along the river drainage towards the northeast, pushed by prevailing winds. Extreme fire behavior was reported, including flame lengths of 50 to 60 feet, a rapid rate of spread, and long-range spotting. At points the fire produced a pyrocumulus cloud.

Many aerial attack assets were committed to the fire in an effort to halt its progress and protect structures and lives. At one point up to 24 aircraft and helicopters were engaged on the incident.

Fire behavior moderated in the evening of August 4 as the fire reached sparser fuels in the area of Chicago Park. By the end of the day the fire was assessed at 1,400 acres, which was revised to 2,400 acres the following morning. The fire experienced little major growth overnight or in the following days, with firefighting activity mostly confined to suppressing hotspots and building containment line.

On August 13, 2021, the River Fire was declared 100% contained. All evacuation warnings in Nevada and Placer Counties were lifted, as well as all evacuation orders in Placer County. On August 16, 2021, all areas under an evacuation order in Nevada County were reopened to the public after residents were able to survey the damage and retrieve property.

Impacts 
While the fire was burning on August 4th and 5th, approximately 6,600 people in Nevada and Placer Counties were under mandatory evacuation orders (2,400 in Placer County, and 4,200 in Nevada County), including the entire town of Colfax.

The River Fire destroyed 142 structures. Of these, 102 were single-family residential buildings, 1 was a commercial building, and 39 were outbuildings. In addition to the 142 destroyed structures, 21 structures were damaged. Four people were injured by the fire: two civilians and two firefighters, including  a water tender driver who suffered minor burns.

On August 24, 2021, President Joe Biden approved a disaster declaration request for counties impacted by the ongoing Dixie Fire and the River Fire. Nevada and Placer Counties were able to seek public assistance for emergency work and repairs, and individuals affected in those counties were able to request financial assistance for any disaster-related needs through FEMA.

In late October, during widespread heavy precipitation brought by an atmospheric river and the October 2021 Northeast Pacific bomb cyclone, some areas that burned in the River Fire were again temporarily placed under mandatory evacuation orders due to potential for flash flooding.

Cause 
CAL FIRE and Placer County Fire Department investigators began working immediately to determine the cause of the fire. On September 10, 2021, CAL FIRE put out a news release stating: "It has been determined that the River Fire started in the overnight camping area of the Bear River Campground and was human caused. This is an active case, and CAL FIRE investigators will continue to work on determining the specific details leading to the cause of the fire."

On March 7, 2022, CAL FIRE put out another update on the investigation. It specified that investigators had determined that the River Fire started on the brush alongside the Bear River's edge in the overnight camping area of the Bear River Campground, but did not start in a designated camp site. According to the investigation news release, "Multiple people tried to extinguish the fire in its early stages. During the investigation, items were found near the fire's origin indicating a person(s) had recently been present in the area." The report also stated that there was "no evidence to support any malicious intent or criminal charges at this time."

See also 

 2021 California wildfires
 List of California wildfires

References 

2021 California wildfires
August 2021 events in the United States
Wildfires in Placer County, California
Colfax, California
Wildfires in Nevada County, California